Avukaya is an ethnic group of South Sudan. Some members of this ethnic have fled to the Democratic Republic of the Congo due to persecution.  About 50,000 members of this ethnic group live in South Sudan. Many members of this ethnic group belong to the Christian minority of South Sudan. The Avukaya traditionally live in a rain-forest area in Equatoria close to the Democratic Republic of Congo in Southern Sudan.

Historically, the Avokaya people are originally in Maridi town, Mambe, Bahr-Olo and Amaki. Besides Maridi, the Avukaya people are found in Tore Payam of Yei river County, Yei town, Bangolo Payam in Mundri County and other towns of the Sudan too. The Avokaya are the group of ethnic tribes that combined with the Moru on the mountains to put an end to the King Gbudwe of the Azande invasion of their territory. They are known for a dance called Mamburuku and socialisation with other tribes. Many speak Pa-Zande, Moru and Baka languages in addition to Avokaya.

The Avukaya commonly enjoy Pirinda with Nyasa (food made of sorghum or millet or cassava flour). They also like some wild fruits Omi and Kaniki) and yams.

External links

Overview of Avukaya on gurtong.net

Ethnic groups in the Democratic Republic of the Congo
Ethnic groups in South Sudan